Patrick McEnroe and Richey Reneberg were the defending champions but only Reneberg competed that year with Jim Grabb.

Grabb and Reneberg lost in the first round to Mark Kratzmann and Brett Steven.

Jacco Eltingh and Paul Haarhuis won in the final 6–4, 7–6 against Byron Black and Jonathan Stark.

Seeds

  Jacco Eltingh /  Paul Haarhuis (champions)
  Byron Black /  Jonathan Stark (final)
  Grant Connell /  Patrick Galbraith (first round)
  Todd Woodbridge /  Mark Woodforde (semifinals)

Draw

External links
1994 Australian Indoor Championships Doubles Draw

Doubles